Dizaj-e Hatam Khan (also Romanized as Dīzaj-e Ḩātam Khān) is a village in Hajjilar-e Jonubi Rural District, Hajjilar District, Chaypareh County, West Azerbaijan Province, Iran. At the 2006 census, its population was 297, in 69 families.

References 

Populated places in Chaypareh County